John Goff may refer to:

John Goff (politician) (1814–1892), Canadian landowner and legislator from Prince Edward Island
John D. Goff (born 1970), American musician
John S. Goff (1931–2001), American historian
John W. Goff (1848–1924), American lawyer and judge from New York City
John William Goff (baseball) (1925–2009), American baseball player

See also
John Goffe (1701–1786), soldier in colonial America
Jonathan Goff (born 1985), former NFL football player